Lynne Joanne Franks  (born 16 April 1948) founded a public relations consultancy in the early 1970s and is a communications strategist, writer and spokeswoman on women's issues, sustainability and consumer lifestyles.

Early life
Franks was born and raised in North London in 1948. The daughter of a Jewish butcher, Franks attended Minchenden Grammar School in Southgate, leaving at the age of 16. She completed a shorthand typing course at Pitman's College and was a regular dancer on the popular music TV programme Ready Steady Go! Franks initially worked in various secretarial jobs before taking up a journalistic role at Petticoat, working under Eve Pollard and alongside Janet Street-Porter. Whilst assigned to write for and edit the Freemans in-house publications, she met Paul Howie, an Australian fashion buyer and designer, whom she later married.

Lynne Franks PR
Following a brief stint as a PR assistant, and at the encouragement of the fashion designer Katharine Hamnett, Franks started her own PR agency at the age of 21, with her first clients including Hamnett's own fashion business, Tuttabankem, and Wendy Dagworthy. Working initially from her home, the new agency then moved into increasing larger premises in the Covent Garden area of London.

In the summer of 1974, she supported her husband in setting up Howie, a menswear store on Fulham Road.

In 1979, Franks's PR agency was commissioned by the Murjani Corporation to launch Gloria Vanderbilt jeans, one of the first designer jeans to be launched in the UK. Franks used this relationship in 1984 to help persuade Murjani to sponsor a large fashion tent outside the Commonwealth Institute in Kensington. This helped to grow the then fledgling London Fashion Week.

Over the next few years, Lynne Franks PR worked with many high street brands including Harvey Nichols, Tommy Hilfiger, Brylcreem, Raleigh Bicycles and Swatch. Her agency also represented Katharine Hamnett, Jasper Conran, and Jean-Paul Gaultier; figures from the world of entertainment such as Annie Lennox, Lenny Henry and Ruby Wax, and worked briefly with the Labour Party in 1986, helping to promote Neil Kinnock ahead of the 1987 general election. As the agency grew, LFPR attracted non-fashion brands and a food and drink division was added.

Her company was also involved with a number of charities and NGOs. In 1985, Franks helped to initiate Fashion Cares, a fundraising series of events which have since gone on to raise more than $10 million for HIV/Aids In the same year, she helped in the promotion of Live Aid and worked with Bob Geldof and Harvey Goldsmith to create Fashion Aid which raised $300,000 in aid of victims of famine in Africa.

Franks's agency worked with Amnesty International, helping to promote their fund-raising Human Rights Now! world tour, and with John Elkington to promote Green Consumer Week in 1988. Franks attended the Greenham Common Women's Peace Camp in 1984.

It has been claimed by Franks that the character Edina Monsoon in the UK sitcom Absolutely Fabulous (created by Jennifer Saunders, a long-time friend and frequent associate of Franks) was intended to be a satirised version of Franks during this period. The claim has been denied by Saunders.

Advocate for women's empowerment
In October 1993, it was announced that she was stepping down as chairman of her company and would concentrate on broadcasting and campaigning on Women's Empowerment and Sustainable living. In July 1995, Franks chaired a consortium that launched Viva! 963, Britain's first radio station for women, with Franks herself hosting a twice-weekly interview show entitled Frankly Speaking.

In order to boost awareness of the upcoming Fourth UN World Conference on Women, which Franks was to attend, she created What Women Want, a two-day festival of seminars, workshops and music at the Royal Festival Hall in London. Held over the bank holiday weekend in August 1995, the event attracted almost 10,000 visitors, with The Big Issue devoting an entire edition to the event and the surrounding issues. The highlight of the festival was a concert on the final night hosted by the comedian Jo Brand, and featuring performances from Sinéad O'Connor, The Pretenders, Sarah Jane Morris and Zap Mama.

In 1997, Franks published her autobiography, Absolutely Now!: A Futurist's Journey to Her Inner Truth, which made the Los Angeles Times best-seller list. The book chronicles Franks' emotional and spiritual journey since leaving the world of PR, interspersing her spiritual experiences at locations such as the Findhorn Foundation in Scotland, the Esalen Institute in California and the Brahma Kumaris World Spiritual University in Rajasthan, India, with her ideas on feminism, environmental issues and ethical business practices.

Following the book's publication, Franks moved to California, and formed GlobalFusion, a cause-related marketing agency, working to promote environmentally-friendly fashion and cosmetic brands and helping to launch The Big Issue in Los Angeles. She also worked with the United Nations Educational, Scientific, and Cultural Organisation on promoting micro-finance initiatives through their 'Knitting Together Nations' project, helping women refugees from Bosnia and Herzegovina and with Bibi Russell on her 'Fashion for Development' program in Bangladesh.

SEED
Whilst in California, Franks developed the idea of SEED, an acronym for Sustainable Enterprise and Empowerment Dynamics, as a model for using principles of femininity, sustainability and social responsibility in business. In 2000, Franks published The SEED Handbook: The Feminine Way to Create Business, a guidebook for female entrepreneurs, and it has since gone on to sell more than 50,000 copies in the UK and US alone.

Franks has since published two more books. In 2004, she published Grow: The Modern Woman's Handbook. This was followed in 2007 by Bloom: A Woman's Journal for Inspired Living, an accompaniment to a set of Affirmation Cards released previously.

In collaboration with Tribal Education, Franks developed the SEED Women into Enterprise Programme, a blended learning course for self-employment. Aimed particularly at women from marginalised and disadvantaged communities around the UK, the programme has been delivered through local government agencies, training companies and charities—including Croydon Enterprise, A4e and The Prince's Trust—as well as to inmates at Eastwood Park and Styal prisons.

The SEED project has continued to grow with workshops and training events held around the UK, online resources and exclusive, week long retreats held regularly by Franks at her  home in Deià, Majorca. Local SEED Circles have started up in many areas to provide members with opportunities to network with like-minded business owners in the community, whilst accredited SEED Coaches provide mentoring to new businesswomen starting out. In 2009, she launched the SEED Community Site, a social networking website to connect women entrepreneurs around the world.

Strategic advisor
Franks has worked as a communications consultant for a number of multinational corporations in recent years, working on their female employee development programmes, and advising on market positioning strategies, particularly for female consumers. She was a member of the advisory board for McDonald's in the UK, helping to initiate their Women's Leadership Development Programme.

She has worked with Regus to create and develop the B.Hive network of women's business clubs, launching the flagship Covent Garden location in September 2010, followed by further B.Hive centres in Bristol and Manchester in spring 2011.

V-Day campaign
Franks is currently the chair of V-Day UK, a charity created by Eve Ensler, that campaigns to end violence against women and girls. In March 2009, she organised a Women of Influence Lunch at the House of Lords, to draw attention to the campaign. The lunch was hosted by Baroness Valerie Amos and featured Sarah Brown as the guest speaker, with attendees including Glenys Kinnock, Oona King and Sandi Toksvig.

In June 2009, she organised a breakfast at the House of Commons to host the Congolese Senator and activist, Eve Bazaiba. Attended by Eric Joyce MP (chair of the all-party parliamentary group for the Great Lakes Region of Africa), Baroness Trish Morris and Sam Roddick amongst many others, the event promoted action plans such as fundraising and advocacy strategies.

The following November, Franks organised the Great Congo Demonstration at the Royal Albert Hall on the 100th anniversary of the then Archbishop of Canterbury's call for an end to the violence in the Congo. Supported by the Archbishop, and other religious leaders, politicians, activists and celebrities, and accompanied by group letters to the press, the demonstration called for an end to the systemic sexual violence against women in the region. The event helped to boost the profile of the campaign, receiving significant press coverage and was mentioned favourably during a debate in the House of Lords.

Public appearances
Franks has featured regularly in the broadcast and print media in recent years. She is a regular contributor to topical and current affairs programmes with appearances on shows such as This Week, Radio 4's Woman's Hour and Loose Women, where she appeared along with Britt Ekland. She was also a guest on Newsnight in June 2010, discussing the expected cuts to public expenditure in the forthcoming UK budget with reference to Thatcher's economic policies in the 1980s.

She has also made various other television appearances. In November 2007, Franks was a contestant on the seventh series of I'm a Celebrity...Get Me Out of Here!, and contributed to the third series of Grumpy Old Women in the same year. She was a member of the Bizchicks team of entrepreneurs who competed on the Eggheads quiz show in November 2008, alongside teammates including the former dragon, Rachel Elnaugh, Laura Tenison and Emma Harrison, in order to raise money for The Nema Foundation, a charity running projects to relieve child poverty in Mozambique.

In February 2009, she guested on the sixth series of the Channel 4 Programme, Come Dine with Me, and also appeared alongside guests including Ken Livingstone, Carol Decker and Toby Young on the BBC Two show, The Supersizers Eat..., the following June.

Franks has made public speaking engagements, including at Oxford University in 2007 for International Women's Day, and at Glastonbury Festival in the same year. She delivered the 23rd HSBC Bank keynote lecture at Brunel University in November 2008, was on the judging panel for several enterprise award bodies including the Cartier Women's Initiative Awards and performed a stand-up comedy routine at ITV's London Studios for International Women's Day 2009. She also continues to write a monthly column for Natural Health Magazine.

In July 2011, Franks was awarded an honorary doctorate from Middlesex University in recognition of her career achievements in business and the media.

Notes

References
O'Byrne, Robert (2009). Style City: How London Became a Fashion Capital, Frances Lincoln Ltd, UK. 
Europa Publications (2004). The International Who's Who 2004, Routledge, UK. 
Fraser, Kennedy (1981). The fashionable mind: reflections on fashion, 1970–1981, Knopf, USA. 
Franks, Lynne (1997). Absolutely Now!: A Futurist's Journey to Her Inner Truth, Woodstock, Overlook Press.

External links
Lynne Franks' personal website
The SEED Network
The SEED Community Site
V-Day UK

1948 births
Living people
English Jews
British women's rights activists
British public relations people
Officers of the Order of the British Empire
I'm a Celebrity...Get Me Out of Here! (British TV series) participants